Scheib is a surname. Notable people with the surname include: 

Carl Scheib (1927–2018), American baseball player
Earl Scheib (1908-1992), American car-painting business founder
Jay Scheib (born 1969), American stage director, playwright and artist
Skippy Scheib (1903–1989), American football player
Walter Scheib (1954–2015), American chef